Renato Bossi (born 7 December 1917) was an Italian film actor and tennis player of the 1930s and 1940s.

A Milanese tennis player, Bossi represented Italy in a 1938 Davis Cup tie against France in Paris, where he lost a reverse singles rubber to Pierre Pellizza in five sets. He won the men's doubles and mixed doubles national championships in 1946. As an actor, Bossi's credits include the 1948 Duilio Coletti film Il grido della terra and the 1950 Sergio Grieco film Il sentiero dell'odio. He was married to German tennis player Anneliese Ullstein.

Bossi died at a young age from leukemia.

See also
List of Italy Davis Cup team representatives

Notes

References

External links
 
 
 
 

1917 births
Year of death missing
Italian male tennis players
Italian male film actors
Tennis players from Milan
Actors from Milan
Deaths from leukemia